Bishop Stepan Sus (born 7 October 1981) is a Ukrainian Greek Catholic hierarch as Titular Bishop of Zygris and Curial Bishop of Ukrainian Catholic Major Archeparchy of Kyiv–Galicia since 15 November 2019.

Life
Bishop Sus was born in family of Yaroslav and Oksana (née Bodnar) Sus in Lviv, but grew up in the neighbouring village Chyshky in Pustomyty Raion. After graduation of the school education in Chyshky and the historical-philosophical lyceum run by the Order of Saint Basil the Great in Buchach, he joined the Theological Seminary in Lviv, simultaneously studying in the Ukrainian Catholic University (1999–2006). After graduation he was ordained as priest on 30 June 2006.

He continued his study in the University of Lviv with magister in the philosophy degree and in the Catholic University of Lublin with magister in the pastoral theology degree. During 2006–2011 he worked as a military chaplain in Lviv and from 2011 until his bishop's appointment in 2019 was parish priest in the Saints Peter and Paul Garrison Church in Lviv.

On 15 November 2019 he was confirmed by Pope Francis as Curial Bishop of Ukrainian Catholic Major Archeparchy of Kyiv–Galicia, Ukraine and Titular Bishop of Zygris. He was consecrated as bishop by Major Archbishop Sviatoslav Shevchuk and other hierarchs of the Ukrainian Greek Catholic Church in the Cathedral of the Resurrection of Christ in Kyiv on 12 January 2020.

References

External links

1981 births
Living people
Clergy from Lviv
Lviv Seminary alumni
University of Lviv alumni
Ukrainian Catholic University alumni
John Paul II Catholic University of Lublin alumni
Ukrainian Eastern Catholics
Bishops of the Ukrainian Greek Catholic Church
Recipients of the Order of Merit (Ukraine), 3rd class